Mariazofia is a genus of ground-dwelling Afrotropical beetles in the family Tenebrionidae. They are among the largest of the darkling beetles. Like other genera within subtribe Molurina, adults of this genus engage in a behavior known as "substrate tapping", a form of sexual communication in which they produce vibrations by tapping their abdomen rhythmically on the ground to attract mates. Their common name, "tok-tok beetle" or "toktokkie beetle", is based on this behavior.

Etymology
The name of this genus —Mariazofia— is a portmanteau of the names of the daughters (Maria and Zofia) of the first author of the paper in which it is first described.

Description
It is similar in appearance to Moluris, having confined patches of bristles on the abdomen in males, as well as a similar structure of the female abdominal terminalia. Mariazofia can be distinguished from Moluris because the head is prognathous in the case of Mariazofia, while it is hypognathous in Moluris. Also the pronotal disc is nonconvex in the case of Mariazofia, while it is convex in Moluris.

Distribution and habitat
These beetles are widely distributed throughout Southern Africa in various habitats, ranging from coastal forests to hills, woodlands, and deserts.

Species
A detailed cladistic analysis of specimens within the tribe Sepidiini was recently completed, based on certain anatomic features of female specimens (e.g., ovipositor, genital tubes, spiculum ventrale and proctiger). This analysis has resulted in a major revision of the taxonomic classification within this tribe, including the description of several novel taxa. Among these is Mariazofia, first described in 2022 by Kamiński, et al. Most of the species within this new genus were previously classified within genus Psammodes. As of late 2022, the genus contains 141 species, including:

Mariazofia algoensis 
Mariazofia asperulipennis 
Mariazofia atrata 
Mariazofia barbata 
Mariazofia basuto 
Mariazofia batesi  (southern Africa)
Mariazofia bennigseni 
Mariazofia brunnipes 
Mariazofia caelata 
Mariazofia caffra 
Mariazofia caraboides 
Mariazofia carinata 
Mariazofia clara 
Mariazofia collaris 
Mariazofia colorata 
Mariazofia comata 
Mariazofia convexa 
Mariazofia coriacea 
Mariazofia costalis 
Mariazofia dejeani 
Mariazofia depressicollis 
Mariazofia devexa 
Mariazofia difficilis 
Mariazofia diluta 
Mariazofia dimidiata 
Mariazofia dohrni 
Mariazofia eberlanzi 
Mariazofia ethologa 
Mariazofia expleta 
Mariazofia farta  (South Africa)
Mariazofia ferruginea 
Mariazofia flagrans 
Mariazofia fragilis 
Mariazofia fritschi 
Mariazofia funesta 
Mariazofia gariesa 
Mariazofia gibba coelata 
Mariazofia gibba gibba 
Mariazofia gibba gravida 
Mariazofia gibba hemisphaerica 
Mariazofia gibba nigrocostata 
Mariazofia gibba solieri 
Mariazofia gibba unicolor 
Mariazofia glabra 
Mariazofia glabrata biena 
Mariazofia glabrata glabrata 
Mariazofia grandis 
Mariazofia granulata 
Mariazofia granulifer 
Mariazofia guillarmodi 
Mariazofia haagi 
Mariazofia herero 
Mariazofia hirtipennis 
Mariazofia hirtipes 
Mariazofia hirta 
Mariazofia hottentottus 
Mariazofia incongruens 
Mariazofia infernalis 
Mariazofia intermedia 
Mariazofia janitor 
Mariazofia kamagasa 
Mariazofia kirschi 
Mariazofia kubub 
Mariazofia kuisip  (Namibia)
Mariazofia laevicollis 
Mariazofia lanuginosa 
Mariazofia lethargica 
Mariazofia memnonia 
Mariazofia mimipinguis 
Mariazofia moschleri 
Mariazofia muata 
Mariazofia nigrisaxicola 
Mariazofia nitens 
Mariazofia nitidicollis 
Mariazofia nitidipennis 
Mariazofia nitidissima 
Mariazofia obsulcata 
Mariazofia ovata 
Mariazofia ovipennis 
Mariazofia perfida 
Mariazofia picea 
Mariazofia pilifer 
Mariazofia pilosella 
Mariazofia pilosipennis 
Mariazofia pilosa  (Namibia)
Mariazofia pinguis 
Mariazofia plicata 
Mariazofia plicipennis 
Mariazofia ponderosa  (South Africa)
Mariazofia procera 
Mariazofia procustes 
Mariazofia profana 
Mariazofia propinqua 
Mariazofia protensa 
Mariazofia pubescens 
Mariazofia pustulifer 
Mariazofia quadricostata 
Mariazofia rauca 
Mariazofia refleximargo 
Mariazofia retrospinosa 
Mariazofia rotundicollis 
Mariazofia rufofasciata 
Mariazofia rufonervosa 
Mariazofia rufostriata 
Mariazofia rugulosipennis 
Mariazofia rugulosa 
Mariazofia rustica 
Mariazofia scabrata gariepina 
Mariazofia scabrata scabrata  (South Africa)
Mariazofia scabriuscula 
Mariazofia segnis 
Mariazofia semipilosa 
Mariazofia semivillosa 
Mariazofia solitaria 
Mariazofia spiculosa 
Mariazofia splendens 
Mariazofia steinhelli 
Mariazofia striatopilosa 
Mariazofia subaenea 
Mariazofia subcostata 
Mariazofia subgranulata 
Mariazofia tenuipes 
Mariazofia timarchoides 
Mariazofia togatus 
Mariazofia tomentosus 
Mariazofia trachysceloides 
Mariazofia transvaalensis 
Mariazofia tricostata 
Mariazofia tumidipennis 
Mariazofia undulata 
Mariazofia uniformis litoralis 
Mariazofia uniformis rugigaster 
Mariazofia uniformis uniformis 
Mariazofia valida 
Mariazofia velutina 
Mariazofia ventricosa 
Mariazofia villosostriata 
Mariazofia villosula 
Mariazofia vittata 
Mariazofia volvula 
Mariazofia zschokkei

References

Pimeliinae
Tenebrionidae genera